The Bride of Abydos is a drama in 3 acts written by William Dimond and based on Lord Byron's same-titled poem. It was staged on 5 February 1818 at Drury Lane and published the same year by Richard White in London. It was one of three Dimond's plays whose action takes place in Turkey, the other two being Abon Hassan (based on 1001 nights) and Aethiop, or the Child of the Desart. In the first edition the drama is called "a tragic play", while in the second (printed in London by Thomas Hailes Lacy) it is labelled as "a romantic drama". Dimond's play had an influence on Percy Bysshe Shelley's Hellas.

Byron's poem was too short to make a full-length play of it, and Dimond made many additions to it. Furthermore, he found the final too gloomy and catastrophic and substituted it by an incident from Byron's another poem, The Corsair. All these changes were explained by the author in the Preface.

For the first performance the scenery was made by Greenwood and the music was composed by Michael Kelly (it included an opening chorus, 8 songs, a duet, a bass solo, and a glee). There were also dances.

Roles

External links

References 

1818 plays
British plays
West End plays
Plays by William Dimond